Cottonwood Shores is a city in Burnet County, Texas, United States. The population was 1,123 at the 2010 census.

Geography

Demographics

2020 census

As of the 2020 United States census, there were 1,403 people, 405 households, and 264 families residing in the city.

2000 census
As of the census of 2000, there were 877 people, 312 households, and 232 families residing in the city. The population density was 932.9 people per square mile (360.2/km2). There were 351 housing units at an average density of 373.4 per square mile (144.2/km2). The racial makeup of the city was 88.60% White, 1.03% African American, 1.25% Native American, 0.11% Asian, 0.23% Pacific Islander, 7.75% from other races, and 1.03% from two or more races. Hispanic or Latino of any race were 19.61% of the population.

There were 312 households, out of which 39.7% had children under the age of 18 living with them, 56.4% were married couples living together, 10.6% had a female householder with no husband present, and 25.6% were non-families. 19.9% of all households were made up of individuals, and 8.3% had someone living alone who was 65 years of age or older. The average household size was 2.81 and the average family size was 3.23.

In the city, the population was spread out, with 30.0% under the age of 18, 8.7% from 18 to 24, 30.8% from 25 to 44, 19.2% from 45 to 64, and 11.4% who were 65 years of age or older. The median age was 34 years. For every 100 females, there were 104.0 males. For every 100 females age 18 and over, there were 102.6 males.

The median income for a household in the city was $36,094, and the median income for a family was $37,656. Males had a median income of $28,333 versus $17,500 for females. The per capita income for the city was $17,664. About 7.6% of families and 9.7% of the population were below the poverty line, including 12.8% of those under age 18 and 3.1% of those age 65 or over.

References

External links
 City of Cottonwood Shores official website
 

Cities in Burnet County, Texas
Cities in Texas